Roger Arnebergh (August 17, 1909 – January 25, 2004) was an American attorney and elected official. He served as Los Angeles City Attorney from 1953 to 1973.

Early life
Roger Arneberg was born in Saint Paul, Minnesota. He was the son of Targe Arnebergh and Amelia Graagaard, who were of  Norwegian and Danish ancestry. Although he dropped out of high school at the age of fifteen, he received a law degree through extension learning.

Career
Arnebergh won the election for Los Angeles City Attorney in 1953 because he was supported by Ray L. Chesebro, who was retiring. He would be re-elected five times with little opposition. Throughout his 20 years as city attorney, Arneburgh usually ran unopposed. However in 1973, Burt Pines and Ira Reiner both ran for the office against Arneburgh. He was then forced into a runoff against Burt Pines, who won by 58%. During those 20 years in office, Arnebergh led a department that increased from 76 to 185 lawyers and was widely praised for his fair handling of disputes among city departments and his enforcement of misdemeanors. After 1973, Arnebergh practiced law privately in Van Nuys. He was briefly in the limelight in 1991, as part of Citizens for Integrity and Viability in the City Charter, which supported former Police Chief Daryl Gates, and was against changes in the selection, removal and tenure of future police chiefs.

Personal life
Arnebergh married Emilie Katherine Rogers (1908–2009), on May 1, 1937. They had one child. Arnebergh died on January 25, 2004.

References

1909 births
2004 deaths
American people of Danish descent
American people of Norwegian descent
Los Angeles City Attorneys
People from Greater Los Angeles
Politicians from Saint Paul, Minnesota
20th-century American politicians
20th-century American lawyers